The 1960 Pittsburgh Pirates season was the team's 79th season. The team finished with a record of 95–59–1, seven games in front of the second-place Milwaukee Braves to win their first National League championship in 33 seasons. The team went on to play the heavily favored New York Yankees, whom they defeated 4 games to 3 in one of the most storied World Series ever.

Offseason 
At the 1959 Winter Meetings, Pirates general manager Joe L. Brown had agreed to trade Dick Groat to the Kansas City Athletics in exchange for Roger Maris. Pirates manager Danny Murtaugh had advised Brown that he did not want to lose Groat, and the deal was never finalized.

Notable transactions 
 Prior to 1960 season: José Martínez was signed as an amateur free agent by the Pirates.

Season standings

National League

Record vs. opponents

Detailed records

Regular season 
On September 6, team captain Dick Groat was drilled on his left wrist by an inside pitch from Braves pitcher Lew Burdette. Groat was lost for the rest of the season. Dick Schofield stepped in for the injured Groat and went three for three in that September 6 game. The Pirates won the game 5–3 and Schofield would go on to hit .414 for the rest of the season.

On September 25 in Milwaukee, the Pirates clinched their first pennant in 33 years.

Game log 

|-style=background:#fbb
| 1 || April 12 || 2:30p.m. EST || @ Braves || 3–4 || McMahon (1–0) || Face (0–1) || Burdette (1) || 2:37 || 39,888 || 0–1 || L1
|-style=background:#cfc
| 2 || April 14 || 1:30p.m. EST || Reds || 13–0 || Law (1–0) || McLish (0–1) || — || 2:13 || 34,064 || 1–1 || W1
|-style=background:#fbb
| 3 || April 16 || 1:30p.m. EST || Reds || 3–11 || Hook (1–0) || Umbricht (0–1) || — || 2:23 || 14,338 || 1–2 || L1
|-style=background:#cfc
| 4  || April 17 || 1:00p.m. EST || Reds || 5–0 || Friend (1–0) || Nuxhall (0–1) || — || 2:02 ||  || 2–2 || W1
|-style=background:#cfc
| 5  || April 17 || 3:37p.m. EST || Reds || 6–5 || Gibbon (1–0) || Wieand (0–1) || — || 2:40 || 16,196 || 3–2 || W2
|-style=background:#fbb
| 6 || April 19 || 8:15p.m. EST || Phillies || 3–4 || Owens (1–0) || Haddix (0–1) || — || 2:23 || 11,443 || 3–3 || L1
|-style=background:#cfc
| 7 || April 20 || 8:15p.m. EST || Phillies || 4–2 || Law (2–0) || Cardwell (1–1) || — || 2:04 || 10,403 || 4–3 || W1
|-style=background:#cfc
| 8 || April 21 || 8:15p.m. EST || Phillies || 11–5 || Green (1–0) || Robinson (0–1) || Face (1) || 3:08 || 9,451 || 5–3 || W2
|-style=background:#cfc
| 9 || April 22 || 8:15p.m. EST || Braves || 6–2 || Friend (2–0) || Jay (0–1) || — || 2:37 || 29,895 || 6–3 || W3
|-style=background:#cfc
| 10 || April 23 || 1:30p.m. EST || Braves || 5–4 || Gibbon (2–0) || Burdette (1–1) || — || 2:39 || 15,502 || 7–3 || W4
|-style=background:#cfc
| 11 || April 24 || 2:00p.m. EDT || Braves || 7–3 || Haddix (1–1) || Buhl (1–1) || Face (2) || 2:17 || 24,758 || 8–3 || W5
|-style=background:#bbb
|–|| April 26 || || @ Phillies || colspan=8 | Postponed (Rain) (Makeup date: July 8)
|-style=background:#cfc
| 12 || April 27 || 8:00p.m. EDT || @ Phillies || 3–2 || Law (3–0) || Meyer (0–1) || — || 2:18 || 9,233 || 9–3 || W6
|-style=background:#cfc
| 13 || April 28 || 8:00p.m. EDT || @ Phillies || 3–0 || Friend (3–0) || Buzhardt (0–2) || — || 2:24 || 8,789 || 10–3 || W7
|-style=background:#bbb
|–|| April 29 || || @ Reds || colspan=8 | Postponed (Rain) (Makeup date: August 18)
|-style=background:#cfc
| 14 || April 30 || 2:30p.m. EDT || @ Reds || 12–7 || Daniels (1–0) || McLish (0–2) || Face (3) || 2:44 || 3,481 || 11–3 || W8
|-

|-style=background:#cfc
| 15 || May 1 || 2:30p.m. EDT || @ Reds || 13–2 || Law (4–0) || Newcombe (1–1) || — || 2:10 || 8,244 || 12–3 || W9
|-style=background:#fbb
| 16 || May 2 || 9:00p.m. EDT || @ Cardinals || 3–4 || Kline (1–0) || Face (0–2) || — || 2:20 || 10,590 || 12–4 || L1
|-style=background:#fbb
| 17 || May 4 || 2:30p.m. EDT || @ Cubs || 1–5 || Ellsworth (1–0) || Friend (3–1) || — || 2:07 || 4,631 || 12–5 || L2
|-style=background:#cfc
| 18 || May 5 || 2:30p.m. EDT || @ Cubs || 9–7 || Green (2–0) || Hobbie (2–3) || Face (4) || 3:02 || 3,429 || 13–5 || W1
|-style=background:#fbb
| 19 || May 6 || 11:15p.m. EDT || @ Giants || 1–5 || Jones (3–2) || Law (4–1) || — || 1:59 || 36,592 || 13–6 || L1
|-style=background:#fbb
| 20 || May 7 || 4:00p.m. EDT || @ Giants || 5–6 || Byerly (1–0) || Green (2–1) || — || 2:32 || 33,066 || 13–7 || L2
|-style=background:#fbb
| 21 || May 8 || 4:00p.m. EDT || @ Giants || 1–13 || McCormick (4–0) || Gibbon (2–1) || — || 2:38 || 40,173 || 13–8 || L3
|-style=background:#fbb
| 22 || May 9 || 11:00p.m. EDT || @ Dodgers || 4–7 || Sherry (4–3) || Face (0–3) || — || 2:37 || 23,417 || 13–9 || L4
|-style=background:#cfc
| 23 || May 10 || 11:00p.m. EDT || @ Dodgers || 3–2 || Law (5–1) || Podres (2–2) || — || 2:20 || 26,331 || 14–9 || W1
|-style=background:#cfc
| 24 || May 11 || 11:00p.m. EDT || @ Dodgers || 6–3 || Face (1–3) || Koufax (0–3) || — || 2:43 || 27,926 || 15–9 || W2
|-style=background:#cfc
| 25 || May 13 || 9:00p.m. EDT || @ Braves || 8–2 || Friend (4–1) || Willey (2–2) || — || 3:00 || 15,823 || 16–9 || W3
|-style=background:#cfc
| 26 || May 14 || 2:30p.m. EDT || @ Braves || 6–4  || Face (2–3) || McMahon (1–3) || — || 2:45 || 16,865 || 17–9 || W4
|-style=background:#cfc
| 27  || May 15 || 2:00p.m. EDT || @ Braves || 6–4 || Haddix (2–1) || Spahn (2–1) || Umbricht (1) || 2:36 ||  || 18–9 || W5
|-style=background:#fbb
| 28  || May 15 || 5:11p.m. EDT || @ Braves || 2–4 || Pizarro (2–1) || Daniels (1–1) || McMahon (2) || 2:32 || 29,757 || 18–10 || L1
|-style=background:#cfc
| 29 || May 17 || 8:15p.m. EDT || Cubs || 11–6 || Friend (5–1) || Hobbie (3–4) || Face (5) || 2:35 || 16,102 || 19–10 || W1
|-style=background:#cfc
| 30 || May 18 || 8:15p.m. EDT || Cardinals || 4–2 || Law (6–1) || Kline (1–3) || — || 2:12 || 14,615 || 20–10 || W2
|-style=background:#cfc
| 31 || May 19 || 8:15p.m. EDT || Cardinals || 8–3 || Gibbon (3–1) || Sadecki (0–1) || Green (1) || 2:30 || 15,810 || 21–10 || W3
|-style=background:#cfc
| 32 || May 20 || 8:15p.m. EDT || Giants || 5–4  || Green (3–1) || O'Dell (1–4) || — || 3:23 || 39,439 || 22–10 || W4
|-style=background:#fbb
| 33 || May 21 || 1:30p.m. EDT || Giants || 1–3 || Antonelli (3–0) || Friend (5–2) || Byerly (1) || 2:05 || 28,984 || 22–11 || L1
|-style=background:#cfc
| 34 || May 22 || 2:00p.m. EDT || Giants || 8–7  || Face (3–3) || McCormick (5–2) || — || 3:30 || 30,123 || 23–11 || W1
|-style=background:#fbb
| 35 || May 23 || 8:15p.m. EDT || Dodgers || 0–1 || Koufax (1–4) || Daniels (1–2) || — || 2:19 || 16,936 || 23–12 || L1
|-style=background:#fbb
| 36 || May 24 || 8:15p.m. EDT || Dodgers || 2–4 || Podres (3–4) || Gibbon (3–2) || — || 2:22 || 22,920 || 23–13 || L2
|-style=background:#fbb
| 37 || May 25 || 8:15p.m. EDT || Dodgers || 1–5 || Drysdale (4–4) || Umbricht (0–2) || — || 2:13 || 23,975 || 23–14 || L3
|-style=background:#bbb
|–|| May 27 || || Phillies || colspan=8 | Postponed (Rain) (Makeup date: August 16)
|-style=background:#cfc
| 38 || May 28 || 1:30p.m. EDT || Phillies || 4–2  || Umbricht (1–2) || Farrell (2–1) || — || 3:14 || 9,476 || 24–14 || W1
|-style=background:#cfc
| 39 || May 29 || 2:00p.m. EDT || Phillies || 8–5 || Law (7–1) || Roberts (1–6) || Green (2) || 2:15 || 15,704 || 25–14 || W2
|-style=background:#cfc
| 40 || May 30 || 1:00p.m. EDT || Braves || 8–3 || Haddix (3–1) || Spahn (2–2) || Face (6) || 2:25 || 34,233 || 26–14 || W3
|-style=background:#bbb
|–|| May 30 || || Braves || colspan=8 | Postponed (Rain) (Makeup date: July 14)
|-style=background:#cfc
| 41 || May 31 || 8:15p.m. EDT || Reds || 4–3  || Face (4–3) || McLish (2–4) || — || 3:37 || 20,494 || 27–14 || W4
|-

|-style=background:#cfc
| 42 || June 1 || 8:15p.m. EDT || Reds || 5–0 || Friend (6–2) || Purkey (3–2) || — || 1:55 || 26,791 || 28–14 || W5
|-style=background:#cfc
| 43 || June 3 || 8:00p.m. EDT || @ Phillies || 3–0 || Law (8–1) || Buzhardt (1–4) || — || 2:13 || 16,738 || 29–14 || W6
|-style=background:#bbb
|–|| June 4 || || @ Phillies || colspan=8 | Postponed (Rain) (Makeup date: September 20)
|-style=background:#fbb
| 44  || June 5 || 1:00p.m. EDT || @ Phillies || 0–2 || Conley (3–3) || Friend (6–3) || — || 2:00 ||  || 29–15 || L1
|-style=background:#fbb
| 45  || June 5 || 3:35p.m. EDT || @ Phillies || 1–4 || Owens (3–5) || Haddix (3–2) || — || 2:06 || 23,410 || 29–16 || L2
|-style=background:#fbb
| 46 || June 7 || 2:30p.m. EDT || @ Cubs || 2–13 || Ellsworth (3–2) || Law (8–2) || Drabowsky (1) || 2:35 || 8,736 || 29–17 || L3
|-style=background:#cfc
| 47 || June 8 || 2:30p.m. EDT || @ Cubs || 5–3 || Mizell (2–3) || Anderson (2–2) || Face (7) || 2:50 || 9,118 || 30–17 || W1
|-style=background:#cfc
| 48 || June 9 || 2:30p.m. EDT || @ Cubs || 11–3 || Friend (7–3) || Hobbie (5–7) || Green (3) || 2:30 || 7,442 || 31–17 || W2
|-style=background:#fbb
| 49 || June 10 || 9:00p.m. EDT || @ Cardinals || 6–9 || Jackson (8–5) || Haddix (3–3) || McDaniel (8) || 2:50 || 19,532 || 31–18 || L1
|-style=background:#fbb
| 50 || June 11 || 2:30p.m. EDT || @ Cardinals || 6–7 || Duliba (4–2) || Green (3–2) || — || 2:39 || 11,063 || 31–19 || L2
|-style=background:#cfc
| 51  || June 12 || 2:00p.m. EDT || @ Cardinals || 15–3 || Law (9–2) || Kline (2–6) || — || 2:33 ||  || 32–19 || W1
|-style=background:#fbb
| 52  || June 12 || 5:08p.m. EDT || @ Cardinals || 2–5 || Broglio (3–2) || Mizell (2–4) || McDaniel (9) || 2:06 || 29,605 || 32–20 || L1
|-style=background:#cfc
| 53 || June 14 || 11:15p.m. EDT || @ Giants || 6–3 || Friend (8–3) || Jones (8–5) || — || 2:30 || 35,465 || 33–20 || W1
|-style=background:#cfc
| 54 || June 15 || 4:00p.m. EDT || @ Giants || 14–6 || Haddix (4–3) || O'Dell (2–6) || — || 3:15 || 19,180 || 34–20 || W2
|-style=background:#cfc
| 55 || June 16 || 4:00p.m. EDT || @ Giants || 10–7 || Mizell (3–4) || Sanford (6–3) || Face (8) || 3:12 || 17,237 || 35–20 || W3
|-style=background:#cfc
| 56 || June 17 || 11:00p.m. EDT || @ Dodgers || 2–1 || Law (10–2) || Williams (5–1) || — || 2:09 || 43,296 || 36–20 || W4
|-style=background:#cfc
| 57 || June 18 || 11:00p.m. EDT || @ Dodgers || 4–3  || Face (5–3) || Sherry (5–4) || — || 2:36 || 50,062 || 37–20 || W5
|-style=background:#fbb
| 58 || June 19 || 5:00p.m. EDT || @ Dodgers || 6–8 || Roebuck (4–1) || Daniels (1–3) || Williams (1) || 2:51 || 41,118 || 37–21 || L1
|-style=background:#cfc
| 59 || June 21 || 8:15p.m. EDT || Cardinals || 3–2 || Law (11–2) || Gibson (0–1) || Face (9) || 2:23 || 21,292 || 38–21 || W1
|-style=background:#cfc
| 60 || June 22 || 8:15p.m. EDT || Cardinals || 5–0 || Friend (9–3) || Jackson (9–7) || — || 2:30 || 21,320 || 39–21 || W2
|-style=background:#fbb
| 61 || June 23 || 8:15p.m. EDT || Cardinals || 1–3 || Kline (3–6) || Haddix (4–4) || McDaniel (12) || 2:14 || 21,151 || 39–22 || L1
|-style=background:#cfc
| 62 || June 24 || 8:15p.m. EDT || Cubs || 4–1 || Mizell (4–4) || Ellsworth (3–5) || — || 2:18 || 28,137 || 40–22 || W1
|-style=background:#cfc
| 63 || June 25 || 1:30p.m. EDT || Cubs || 7–6 || Giel (1–0) || Anderson (2–4) || Face (10) || 2:51 || 20,428 || 41–22 || W2
|-style=background:#fbb
| 64  || June 26 || 1:00p.m. EDT || Cubs || 6–7 || Freeman (3–0) || Friend (9–4) || Elston (5) || 2:58 ||  || 41–23 || L1
|-style=background:#fbb
| 65  || June 26 || 4:33p.m. EDT || Cubs || 5–7 || Morehead (1–6) || Law (11–3) || Elston (6) || 2:46 || 36,378 || 41–24 || L2
|-style=background:#fff
| 66 || June 28 || 8:15p.m. EDT || Giants || 7–7 ||  ||  || — || 3:19 || 30,621 || 41–24 || T1
|-style=background:#bbb
|–|| June 29 || || Giants || colspan=8 | Postponed (Rain) (Makeup date: June 30)
|-style=background:#fbb
| 67  || June 30 || 6:00p.m. EDT || Giants || 0–11 || Sanford (7–5) || Friend (9–5) || — || 2:13 ||  || 41–25 || L1
|-style=background:#cfc
| 68  || June 30 || 8:48p.m. EDT || Giants || 11–6 || Gibbon (4–2) || Miller (2–3) || — || 2:58 || 33,520 || 42–25 || W1
|-

|-style=background:#cfc
| 69 || July 1 || 8:15p.m. EDT || Dodgers || 4–3  || Green (4–2) || Sherry (6–5) || — || 2:20 || 27,312 || 43–25 || W2
|-style=background:#fbb
| 70 || July 2 || 1:30p.m. EDT || Dodgers || 1–6 || Williams || Cheney (0–1) || — || 3:11 || 21,496 || 43–26 || L1
|-style=background:#fbb
| 71 || July 3 || 2:00p.m. EDT || Dodgers || 2–6 || Drysdale || Mizell (4–5) || — || 2:44 || 26,346 || 43–27 || L2
|-style=background:#fbb
| 72  || July 4 || 2:30p.m. EDT || @ Braves || 6–7  || Spahn (7–5) || Face (5–4) || — || 2:05 ||  || 43–28 || L3
|-style=background:#cfc
| 73  || July 4 || 5:10p.m. EDT || @ Braves || 7–2 || Haddix (5–4) || Jay (2–4) || — || 2:57 || 38,478 || 44–28 || W1
|-style=background:#cfc
| 74 || July 5 || 9:00p.m. EDT || @ Braves || 5–4  || Giel (2–0) || Jay (2–5) || Friend (1) || 3:14 || 24,479 || 45–28 || W2
|-style=background:#cfc
| 75 || July 6 || 9:00p.m. EDT || @ Reds || 5–2 || Cheney (1–1) || Purkey (8–4) || Face (11) || 2:35 || 12,292 || 46–28 || W3
|-style=background:#cfc
| 76 || July 7 || 9:00p.m. EDT || @ Reds || 3–2 || Mizell (5–5) || Henry (1–4) || Face (12) || 2:20 || 12,494 || 47–28 || W4
|-style=background:#fbb
| 77  || July 8 || 6:00p.m. EDT || @ Phillies || 5–6  || Farrell (7–2) || Green (4–3) || — || 3:10 ||  || 47–29 || L1
|-style=background:#cfc
| 78  || July 8 || 9:45p.m. EDT || @ Phillies || 8–3 || Friend (10–5) || Green (1–3) || — || 2:33 || 36,056 || 48–29 || W1
|-style=background:#fbb
| 79 || July 9 || 8:00p.m. EDT || @ Phillies || 1–2 || Conley (6–4) || Law (11–4) || — || 2:04 || 19,541 || 48–30 || L1
|-style=background:#cfc
| 80 || July 10 || 1:35p.m. EDT || @ Phillies || 6–2 || Haddix (6–4) || Roberts (5–8) || Face (13) || 2:15 || 13,012 || 49–30 || W1
|- style="background:#bbcaff;"
| colspan="12" | 28th All-Star Game in Kansas City, Missouri
|- style="background:#bbcaff;"
| colspan="12" | 29th All-Star Game in Bronx, New York
|-style=background:#fbb
| 81 || July 14 || 8:15p.m. EDT || Braves || 0–4 || Buhl (9–3) || Haddix (6–5) || Burdette (4) || 2:47 || 35,827 || 49–31 || L1
|-style=background:#fbb
| 82 || July 15 || 8:15p.m. EDT || Reds || 1–4 || O'Toole (7–8) || Friend (10–6) || Brosnan (4) || 2:31 || 29,110 || 49–32 || L2
|-style=background:#cfc
| 83 || July 16 || 1:30p.m. EDT || Reds || 6–5 || Francis (1–0) || Brosnan (3–1) || — || 2:18 || 19,674 || 50–32 || W1
|-style=background:#fbb
| 84  || July 17 || 1:00p.m. EDT || Reds || 5–6 || Purkey (9–5) || Law (11–5) || Brosnan (5) || 2:33 ||  || 50–33 || L1
|-style=background:#cfc
| 85  || July 17 || 4:08p.m. EDT || Reds || 5–0 || Cheney (2–1) || McLish (3–6) || — || 2:20 || 36,290 || 51–33 || W1
|-style=background:#fbb
| 86 || July 19 || 11:00p.m. EDT || @ Dodgers || 4–5 || Sherry (7–7) || Green (4–4) || Roebuck (6) || 2:21 || 51,438 || 51–34 || L1
|-style=background:#fbb
| 87 || July 20 || 11:00p.m. EDT || @ Dodgers || 5–7  || Craig (3–1) || Face (5–5) || — || 3:31 || 51,301 || 51–35 || L2
|-style=background:#cfc
| 88 || July 21 || 11:00p.m. EDT || @ Dodgers || 4–1 || Law (12–5) || Podres (8–7) || — || 2:12 || 51,193 || 52–35 || W1
|-style=background:#cfc
| 89 || July 22 || 11:15p.m. EDT || @ Giants || 4–1 || Mizell (6–5) || McCormick (9–6) || — || 2:14 || 31,878 || 53–35 || W2
|-style=background:#fbb
| 90 || July 23 || 4:00p.m. EDT || @ Giants || 1–3 || Marichal (2–0) || Haddix (6–6) || — || 1:59 || 30,228 || 53–36 || L1
|-style=background:#fbb
| 91 || July 24 || 4:00p.m. EDT || @ Giants || 3–6 || O'Dell (5–8) || Cheney (2–2) || McCormick (3) || 2:30 || 36,447 || 53–37 || L2
|-style=background:#cfc
| 92 || July 25 || 9:00p.m. EDT || @ Cardinals || 4–2 || Friend (11–6) || Kline (3–8) || Face (14) || 2:30 || 23,641 || 54–37 || W1
|-style=background:#cfc
| 93 || July 26 || 9:00p.m. EDT || @ Cardinals || 5–4 || Law (13–5) || Simmons (2–1) || Face (15) || 2:29 || 20,899 || 55–37 || W2
|-style=background:#cfc
| 94 || July 27 || 9:00p.m. EDT || @ Cardinals || 7–3 || Green (5–4) || Sadecki (4–5) || — || 2:58 || 17,236 || 56–37 || W3
|-style=background:#cfc
| 95 || July 29 || 2:30p.m. EDT || @ Cubs || 4–0 || Mizell (7–5) || Brewer (0–3) || — || 2:02 || 9,673 || 57–37 || W4
|-style=background:#fbb
| 96 || July 30 || 2:30p.m. EDT || @ Cubs || 1–6 || Hobbie (10–13) || Friend (11–7) || — || 2:11 || 13,365 || 57–38 || L1
|-style=background:#fbb
| 97 || July 31 || 2:30p.m. EDT || @ Cubs || 2–6 || Cardwell (5–10) || Haddix (6–7) || Elston (7) || 2:21 || 18,297 || 57–39 || L2
|-

|-style=background:#cfc
| 98 || August 2 || 8:15p.m. EDT || Dodgers || 3–0 || Law (14–5) || Williams || — || 2:16 || 25,876 || 58–39 || W1
|-style=background:#fbb
| 99 || August 3 || 8:15p.m. EDT || Dodgers || 1–3  || Podres (9–8) || Friend (11–8) || — || 1:51 || 24,819 || 58–40 || L1
|-style=background:#cfc
| 100 || August 4 || 8:15p.m. EDT || Dodgers || 4–1 || Witt (1–0) || Drysdale (10–11) || Face (16) || 2:35 || 20,748 || 59–40 || W1
|-style=background:#cfc
| 101 || August 5 || 8:15p.m. EDT || Giants || 1–0 || Mizell (8–5) || Jones (13–11) || — || 2:10 || 33,301 || 60–40 || W2
|-style=background:#cfc
| 102 || August 6 || 1:30p.m. EDT || Giants || 8–7  || Law (15–5) || Antonelli (4–7) || — || 3:05 || 28,246 || 61–40 || W3
|-style=background:#cfc
| 103  || August 7 || 1:00p.m. EDT || Giants || 4–1 || Friend (12–8) || Sanford (9–10) || — || 2:14 ||  || 62–40 || W4
|-style=background:#cfc
| 104  || August 7 || 3:49p.m. EDT || Giants || 7–5 || Face (6–5) || Jones (0–1) || — || 2:40 || 35,708 || 63–40 || W5
|-style=background:#cfc
| 105 || August 9 || 8:15p.m. EDT || Cubs || 7–1 || Mizell (9–5) || Drabowsky (2–1) || — || 2:15 || 26,797 || 64–40 || W6
|-style=background:#cfc
| 106 || August 10 || 8:15p.m. EDT || Cubs || 3–1 || Law (16–5) || Cardwell (5–12) || — || 2:00 || 20,074 || 65–40 || W7
|-style=background:#fbb
| 107 || August 11 || 8:15p.m. EDT || Cardinals || 2–3  || Broglio (14–5) || Friend (12–9) || — || 2:57 || 34,212 || 65–41 || L1
|-style=background:#fbb
| 108 || August 12 || 8:15p.m. EDT || Cardinals || 2–9 || Gibson (3–3) || Witt (1–1) || — || 2:54 || 35,439 || 65–42 || L2
|-style=background:#cfc
| 109 || August 13 || 1:30p.m. EDT || Cardinals || 4–1 || Haddix (7–7) || Sadecki (6–6) || — || 2:16 || 24,620 || 66–42 || W1
|-style=background:#cfc
| 110  || August 14 || 1:00p.m. EDT || Cardinals || 9–4 || Law (17–5) || Jackson (13–10) || — || 2:07 ||  || 67–42 || W2
|-style=background:#cfc
| 111  || August 14 || 3:42p.m. EDT || Cardinals || 3–2  || Green (6–4) || McDaniel (10–4) || — || 3:00 || 36,775 || 68–42 || W3
|-style=background:#fbb
| 112 || August 15 || 8:15p.m. EDT || Phillies || 3–4 || Mahaffey (1–0) || Face (6–6) || Short (1) || 2:35 || 19,912 || 68–43 || L1
|-style=background:#cfc
| 113  || August 16 || 6:00p.m. EDT || Phillies || 11–2 || Friend (13–9) || Owens (3–11) || — || 2:20 ||  || 69–43 || W1
|-style=background:#cfc
| 114  || August 16 || 8:55p.m. EDT || Phillies || 4–3 || Face (7–6) || Roberts (8–11) || — || 2:00 || 34,673 || 70–43 || W2
|-style=background:#cfc
| 115 || August 17 || 8:15p.m. EDT || Phillies || 5–3 || Haddix (8–7) || Buzhardt (4–11) || Labine (1) || 2:26 || 33,598 || 71–43 || W3
|-style=background:#cfc
| 116 || August 18 || 9:00p.m. EDT || @ Reds || 3–2 || Law (18–5) || McLish (4–8) || Face (17) || 1:49 || 11,668 || 72–43 || W4
|-style=background:#fbb
| 117 || August 19 || 9:00p.m. EDT || @ Reds || 3–4 || Purkey (13–7) || Mizell (9–6) || Brosnan (10) || 2:21 || 16,347 || 72–44 || L1
|-style=background:#cfc
| 118 || August 20 || 2:30p.m. EDT || @ Reds || 10–7 || Face (8–6) || Maloney (1–4) || — || 2:37 || 8,287 || 73–44 || W1
|-style=background:#fbb
| 119 || August 21 || 2:30p.m. EDT || @ Reds || 4–8 || Hook (10–13) || Friend (13–10) || Brosnan (11) || 2:26 || 15,596 || 73–45 || L1
|-style=background:#cfc
| 120 || August 23 || 2:30p.m. EDT || @ Cubs || 8–3 || Haddix (9–7) || Ellsworth (6–10) || Face (18) || 2:46 || 13,943 || 74–45 || W1
|-style=background:#cfc
| 121 || August 24 || 2:30p.m. EDT || @ Cubs || 10–6 || Face (9–6) || Elston (6–7) || — || 3:03 || 15,268 || 75–45 || W2
|-style=background:#fbb
| 122 || August 25 || 2:30p.m. EDT || @ Cubs || 1–2 || Hobbie (13–16) || Mizell (9–7) || — || 2:31 || 11,701 || 75–46 || L1
|-style=background:#fbb
| 123 || August 26 || 9:00p.m. EDT || @ Cardinals || 1–3 || Broglio (16–6) || Friend (13–11) || — || 2:27 || 24,436 || 75–47 || L2
|-style=background:#fbb
| 124 || August 27 || 9:00p.m. EDT || @ Cardinals || 4–5 || Kline (4–8) || Face (9–7) || — || 2:40 || 30,712 || 75–48 || L3
|-style=background:#fbb
| 125 || August 28 || 2:30p.m. EDT || @ Cardinals || 4–5 || Simmons (5–3) || Haddix (9–8) || McDaniel || 2:43 || 28,579 || 75–49 || L4
|-style=background:#cfc
| 126 || August 29 || 11:00p.m. EDT || @ Dodgers || 10–2 || Law (19–5) || Podres (11–10) || — || 2:31 || 37,369 || 76–49 || W1
|-style=background:#cfc
| 127 || August 30 || 11:00p.m. EDT || @ Dodgers || 5–2 || Friend (14–11) || Koufax (6–11) || Face (19) || 2:35 || 40,143 || 77–49 || W2
|-style=background:#cfc
| 128 || August 31 || 4:00p.m. EDT || @ Giants || 7–4 || Labine (1–0) || O'Dell (7–10) || Face (20) || 2:37 || 16,202 || 78–49 || W3
|-

|-style=background:#cfc
| 129 || September 1 || 4:00p.m. EDT || @ Giants || 6–1 || Haddix (10–8) || Maranda (1–3) || Labine (2) || 2:42 || 13,436 || 79–49 || W4
|-style=background:#fbb
| 130 || September 3 || 1:30p.m. EDT || Phillies || 2–3 || Mahaffey (5–0) || Law (19–6) || — || 2:28 || 18,487 || 79–50 || L1
|-style=background:#cfc
| 131 || September 4 || 1:00p.m. EDT || Phillies || 5–3 || Mizell (10–7) || Owens (3–12) || Labine (3) || 2:17 || 17,856 || 80–50 || W1
|-style=background:#cfc
| 132  || September 5 || 1:00p.m. EDT || Braves || 9–7 || Green (7–4) || Spahn (17–8) || Face (21) || 2:47 ||  || 81–50 || W2
|-style=background:#fbb
| 133  || September 5 || 4:22p.m. EDT || Braves || 1–7 || Buhl (14–8) || Haddix (10–9) || — || 2:31 || 34,310 || 81–51 || L1
|-style=background:#cfc
| 134 || September 6 || 8:15p.m. EDT || Braves || 5–3 || Labine (2–0) || Spahn (17–9) || Face (22) || 2:51 || 28,793 || 82–51 || W1
|-style=background:#fbb
| 135 || September 7 || 8:15p.m. EDT || Cardinals || 1–2 || Broglio (18–7) || Law (19–7) || McDaniel (23) || 2:31 || 31,831 || 82–52 || L1
|-style=background:#cfc
| 136 || September 9 || 8:15p.m. EDT || Cubs || 4–3 || Mizell (11–7) || Ellsworth (6–12) || Face (23) || 2:33 || 24,831 || 83–52 || W1
|-style=background:#cfc
| 137 || September 10 || 1:30p.m. EDT || Cubs || 4–1 || Friend (15–11) || Anderson (7–10) || — || 1:59 || 19,701 || 84–52 || W2
|-style=background:#bbb
|–|| September 11 || || Cubs || colspan=8 | Postponed (Rain) (Makeup date: September 22)
|-style=background:#bbb
|–|| September 11 || || Cubs || colspan=8 | Postponed (Rain) (Makeup date: September 22)
|-style=background:#cfc
| 138 || September 12 || 8:15p.m. EDT || Giants || 6–1 || Haddix (11–9) || Sanford (12–12) || — || 2:28 || 21,261 || 85–52 || W3
|-style=background:#fbb
| 139 || September 13 || 8:15p.m. EDT || Giants || 3–6 || McCormick (13–11) || Mizell (11–8) || — || 2:51 || 21,313 || 85–53 || L1
|-style=background:#fbb
| 140 || September 14 || 8:15p.m. EDT || Dodgers || 2–5 || Williams (14–8) || Law (19–8) || — || 2:35 || 28,547 || 85–54 || L2
|-style=background:#cfc
| 141 || September 15 || 8:15p.m. EDT || Dodgers || 3–1 || Friend (16–11) || Craig (7–3) || — || 2:13 || 12,511 || 86–54 || W1
|-style=background:#fbb
| 142 || September 16 || 9:00p.m. EDT || @ Reds || 3–4 || O'Toole (12–11) || Haddix (11–10) || Brosnan (12) || 2:20 || 9,352 || 86–55 || L1
|-style=background:#bbb
|–|| September 17 || || @ Reds || colspan=8 | Postponed (Rain) (Makeup date: September 18)
|-style=background:#cfc
| 143  || September 18 || 1:00p.m. EDT || @ Reds || 5–3 || Law (20–8) || McLish (4–13) || — || 2:11 ||  || 87–55 || W1
|-style=background:#cfc
| 144  || September 18 || 3:46p.m. EDT || @ Reds || 1–0 || Mizell (12–8) || Purkey (17–9) || — || 2:14 || 14,438 || 88–55 || W2
|-style=background:#cfc
| 145  || September 20 || 6:00p.m. EDT || @ Phillies || 7–1 || Friend (17–11) || Roberts (10–16) || — || 2:15 ||  || 89–55 || W3
|-style=background:#cfc
| 146  || September 20 || 8:50p.m. EDT || @ Phillies || 3–2 || Labine (3–0) || Owens (4–13) || — || 2:26 || 17,216 || 90–55 || W4
|-style=background:#cfc
| 147  || September 22 || 1:00p.m. EDT || Cubs || 3–2  || Face (10–7) || Cardwell (8–15) || — || 2:26 ||  || 91–55 || W5
|-style=background:#cfc
| 148  || September 22 || 4:01p.m. EDT || Cubs || 6–1 || Mizell (13–8) || Anderson (8–11) || — || 2:02 || 19,566 || 92–55 || W6
|-style=background:#fbb
| 149 || September 23 || 9:00p.m. EDT || @ Braves || 1–2 || Buhl (15–9) || Witt (1–2) || — || 2:02 || 17,576 || 92–56 || L1
|-style=background:#fbb
| 150 || September 24 || 2:30p.m. EDT || @ Braves || 2–4 || Burdette (18–12) || Friend (17–12) || — || 2:07 || 20,626 || 92–57 || L2
|-style=background:#fbb
| 151 || September 25 || 2:30p.m. EDT || @ Braves || 2–4  || Piché (3–5) || Face (10–8) || — || 2:14 || 38,109 || 92–58 || L3
|-style=background:#cfc
| 152 || September 27 || 8:15p.m. EDT || Reds || 4–3  || Green (8–4) || McLish (4–14) || — || 4:02 || 22,162 || 93–58 || W1
|-style=background:#fbb
| 153 || September 30 || 8:15p.m. EDT || Braves || 2–13 || Buhl (16–9) || Law (20–9) || — || 2:45 || 25,148 || 93–59 || L1
|-

|-style=background:#cfc
| 154 || October 1 || 1:30p.m. EDT || Braves || 7–3 || Friend (18–12) || Spahn (21–10) || Face (24) || 2:22 || 20,842 || 94–59 || W1
|-style=background:#cfc
| 155 || October 2 || 2:00p.m. EDT || Braves || 9–5 || Mizell (14–8) || Burdette (19–13) || Haddix (1) || 2:25 || 34,578 || 95–59 || W2
|-

|- style="text-align:center;"
| Legend:       = Win       = Loss       = PostponementBold = Pirates team member

Composite Box

Opening Day Lineup

Notable transactions 
 May 28, 1960: Julián Javier and Ed Bauta were traded by the Pirates to the St. Louis Cardinals for Vinegar Bend Mizell and Dick Gray.
 September 1, 1960: Mickey Vernon was signed as a free agent by the Pirates.
 September 30, 1960: Mickey Vernon was released by the Pirates.

Roster

Postseason

1960 World Series 

The 1960 Pirates team, which featured eight All-Stars, was widely predicted to lose the World Series to a powerful New York Yankees team. In one of the most memorable World Series in history, the Pirates were defeated by more than ten runs in three games, won three close games, then recovered from a 7–4 deficit late in Game 7 to eventually win on a walk-off home run by Bill Mazeroski, a second baseman better known for his defensive wizardry.

Game 1 
October 5, 1960, at Forbes Field in Pittsburgh, Pennsylvania. Attendance: 36,676

Game 2 
October 6, 1960, at Forbes Field in Pittsburgh, Pennsylvania. Attendance: 37,308

Game 3 
October 8, 1960, at Yankee Stadium in New York City. Attendance: 70,001

Game 4 
October 9, 1960, at Yankee Stadium in New York City. Attendance: 67,812

Game 5 
October 10, 1960, at Yankee Stadium in New York City. Attendance: 62,753

Game 6 
October 12, 1960, at Forbes Field in Pittsburgh, Pennsylvania. Attendance: 38,580

Game 7 
October 13, 1960, at Forbes Field in Pittsburgh, Pennsylvania. Attendance: 36,683

Game log 

|-style=background:#cfc
| 1 || October 5 || 1:00p.m. EDT || Yankees || 6–4 || Law (1–0) || Ditmar (0–1) || Face (1) || 2:29 || 36,676 || PIT 1–0 || W1
|-style=background:#fbb
| 2 || October 6 || 1:00p.m. EDT || Yankees || 3–16 || Turley (1–0) || Friend (0–1) || || 3:14 || 37,308 || Tied 1–1 || L1
|-style=background:#fbb
| 3 || October 8 || 1:00p.m. EDT || @ Yankees || 0–10 || Ford (1–0) || Mizell (0–1) || || 2:41 || 70,001 || NY 2–1 || L2
|-style=background:#cfc
| 4 || October 9 || 2:00p.m. EDT || @ Yankees || 3–2 || Law (2–0) || Terry (0–1) || Face (2) || 2:29 || 67,812 || Tied 2–2 || W1
|-style=background:#cfc
| 5 || October 10 || 1:00p.m. EDT || @ Yankees || 5–2 || Haddix (1–0) || Ditmar (0–2) || Face (3) || 2:32 || 62,753 || PIT 3–2 || W2
|-style=background:#fbb
| 6 || October 12 || 1:00p.m. EDT || Yankees || 0–12 || Ford (2–0) || Friend (0–2) || || 2:38 || 38,580 || Tied 3–3 || L1
|-style=background:#cfc
| 7 || October 13 || 1:00p.m. EDT || Yankees || 10–9 || Haddix (2–0) || Terry (0–2) || || 2:36 || 36,683 || PIT 4–3 || W1
|-

|- style="text-align:center;"
| Legend:       = Win       = LossBold = Pirates team member

Composite Box 
1960 World Series (4–3): Pittsburgh Pirates (N.L.) over New York Yankees (A.L.)

Statistics 
Batting
Note: G = Games played; AB = At bats; H = Hits; Avg. = Batting average; HR = Home runs; RBI = Runs batted in

Pitching
Note: G = Games pitched; IP = Innings pitched; W = Wins; L = Losses; ERA = Earned run average; SO = Strikeouts

Awards and honors 
 Dick Groat, Shortstop, National League MVP
 Bill Mazeroski, Babe Ruth Award
 Danny Murtaugh, Associated Press NL Manager of the Year

All-Stars 
1960 Major League Baseball All-Star Game, 1960 Major League Baseball All-Star Game
 Smoky Burgess
 Roberto Clemente
 Roy Face
 Bob Friend (starting P, first game)
 Dick Groat
 Vern Law (starting P, second game)
 Bill Mazeroski (starting 2B)
 Bob Skinner (starting LF)

League leaders 
 Roberto Clemente, Led National League in outfield assists, 19 baserunners thrown out
 Dick Groat, Led National League in batting average

Farm system 

LEAGUE CHAMPIONS: Savannah, Hobbs

Notes

References 
 1960 Pittsburgh Pirates team page at Baseball Reference
 1960 Pittsburgh Pirates team page at www.baseball-almanac.com
 

Pittsburgh Pirates seasons
Pittsburgh Pirates season
National League champion seasons
World Series champion seasons
1960 in sports in Pennsylvania